Schnitz is a Melbourne founded and based Australian food franchise operating in the fast-casual dining space, specialising in traditional Schnitzel dishes such as chicken, pork and beef schnitzel, and also offering a vegetarian patty, crumbed and cooked as a schnitzel. Schnitz offers schnitzels in a variety of formats, most notably their "wrap" and "roll" options which can be combined with a drink and their chips in a combo meal, or as a parmigiana served with or without chips and side salads. Schnitz currently has 69 stores located across most states of Australia, most of its stores are located in Victoria, most notably Melbourne and the inner suburbs area including the CBD. Schnitz operate a multitude of stores across regional Victoria, having opened a store in Bendigo, Central Victoria before opening a store in Shepparton in late 2018.

The first Schnitz store was opened in 2007 by Roman Dyduk who is joined by his two sons, Tom and Andrew in ownership and operation of the company to this day. 2016 was the most successful year for Schnitz opening stores all around Australia including Bendigo, Victoria. In 2016 Schnitz was ranked the 32nd Fastest Growing Franchise by BRW Fast Franchises after achieving 75% growth.

Stores

The state and territory breakdown of Schnitz's current 69 stores include; 43 in Victoria, 11 in New South Wales, 10 in Queensland, two in the ACT, two in Western Australia and one in South Australia. They have yet to expand into the Northern Territory or Tasmania.

In 2017 they opened stores in Cairns, Toowoomba, Queensland and Wagga Wagga, New South Wales.

At its height Schnitz had over 73 stores in operation throughout Australia. Stores which have closed since its major expansion period include:

Schnitz Merrylands, NSW - Closed 2017

Schnitz World Square, NSW - Closed 2018

Schnitz Acland Street, VIC - Closed 2018

Schnitz Rockingham Centre, WA - Closed 2019

Schnitz Garden City, QLD - Closed 2020

Schnitz Newmarket, QLD - Closed 2020

References

External links

Fast-food chains of Australia
Restaurants established in 2007
2007 establishments in Australia